James Carroll Fox (November 6, 1928 – March 23, 2019) was a United States district judge of the United States District Court for the Eastern District of North Carolina.

Education and career
Fox was born in Atchison, Kansas and graduated from Woodberry Forest School in 1946. He received a Bachelor of Science degree from the University of North Carolina in 1950. He was in the United States Army Reserves from 1951 to 1959 and became a Corporal. He then received a Juris Doctor from the University of North Carolina School of Law in 1957, serving as a law clerk to Judge Donnell Gilliam of the United States District Court for the Eastern District of North Carolina from 1957 to 1958. He was in private practice in Wilmington, North Carolina, from 1958 to 1982, and was also a county attorney of New Hanover County, North Carolina from 1967 to 1981.

Federal judicial service

On September 14, 1982, Fox was nominated by President Ronald Reagan to a new United States District Court for the Eastern District of North Carolina seat created by 92 Stat. 1629. He was confirmed by the United States Senate on September 29, 1982, and received his commission on September 30, 1982. He served as Chief Judge from 1990 to 1997, and assumed senior status on January 31, 2001. Fox retired into inactive senior status on March 31, 2017, meaning that while he remained a federal judge, he no longer heard cases or participated in the business of the court. He died on March 23, 2019, in Wilmington, North Carolina.

References

Sources
 

1928 births
2019 deaths
People from Atchison, Kansas
People from Wilmington, North Carolina
Military personnel from Kansas
Judges of the United States District Court for the Eastern District of North Carolina
United States district court judges appointed by Ronald Reagan
20th-century American judges
United States Army non-commissioned officers
University of North Carolina alumni
University of North Carolina School of Law alumni
North Carolina lawyers
United States Army reservists